Lemon Grove Depot is a station on the Orange Line of the San Diego Trolley. It is located in the San Diego suburb of Lemon Grove, California and serves the densely populated surrounding commercial and residential area.

The station has also been home to a farmers market on Saturdays since January 2015.

History
Lemon Grove Depot opened as part of the second segment of the Euclid Line on May 12, 1989.

This station was renovated from winter 2012 through fall 2013 as part of the Trolley Renewal Project, although the station remained open during construction.

Station layout
There are two tracks, each served by a side platform.

Lemon Grove Promenade
Lemon Grove officials launched a $5.1 million project on redeveloping the immediate area surrounding the Lemon Grove Depot into a Promenade, which was designed to include a plaza, park, and two windmills to help generate electricity. Construction of this promenade began on July 19, 2012, with its grand opening ceremony held on September 27, 2013. The project subsequently won an award.

See also
 List of San Diego Trolley stations
 Lemon Grove Historical Society

References

Orange Line (San Diego Trolley)
San Diego Trolley stations
Railway stations in the United States opened in 1989
1989 establishments in California